Sissa may refer to:

People
 Giulia Sissa (born 1954), Italian classical scholar and historian of philosophy
 Sissa ibn Dahir, mythical brahmin

Places
 Sissa (Sissa Trecasali), Parma, Emilia-Romagna, Italy
 Sissa River, Flores, East Nusa Tenggara, Indonesia
 Sissa Trecasali, Parma, Emilia-Romagna, Italy

Other
 SISSA, also known as International School for Advanced Studies, post-graduate-education and research institute in Trieste, Italy